In the mathematical theory of partial differential equations, a Monge equation, named after Gaspard Monge, is a first-order partial differential equation for an unknown function u in the independent variables x1,...,xn

that is a polynomial in the partial derivatives of u.  Any Monge equation has a Monge cone.

Classically, putting u = x0, a Monge equation of degree k is written in the form

and expresses a relation between the differentials dxk. The Monge cone at a given point (x0, ..., xn) is the zero locus of the equation in the tangent space at the point.

The Monge equation is unrelated to the (second-order) Monge–Ampère equation.

References

 

Partial differential equations